Tinissa palmodes is a moth of the family Tineidae. It was described by Edward Meyrick in 1917. It is found on New Guinea.

References

Moths described in 1917
Scardiinae